Martin Champoux  (born 1968) is a Canadian politician. He was elected to the  House of Commons of Canada in the 2019 election  from Drummond as a member of the Bloc Québécois.

Electoral record

References

External links
 

Bloc Québécois MPs
Members of the House of Commons of Canada from Quebec
21st-century Canadian politicians
Living people
1968 births
People from Sainte-Julie, Quebec